The Hockey Hall of Fame is a hall of fame and museum dedicated to the history of ice hockey. It was established in 1943 and is located in Toronto, Ontario, Canada. Originally, there were two categories for induction, players and builders, and in 1961, a third category for on-ice officials was introduced. In 2010, a subcategory was established for female players. In 1988, a "veteran player category" was established in order to "provide a vehicle for players who may have been overlooked and whose chances for election would be limited when placed on the same ballot with contemporary players". Eleven players were inducted into the category, but in 2000 the board of directors eliminated it and those inductees are now considered to be in the player category.

For a person to be inducted to the Hockey Hall of Fame, he or she must be nominated by an elected 18-person selection committee which includes Hockey Hall of Fame members and media personalities. Each committee member is allowed to nominate one person in each category per year, and candidates must receive the support of 75% of the members of the committee that are present, or a minimum of ten votes. In any given year, there can be a maximum of four male players, two female players, and a combined two in the builders and on-ice officials categories. For a player, referee, or linesman to be nominated, the person must have been retired for a minimum three years. Builders may be "active or inactive". The induction ceremony is held at the current Hall of Fame building and was first broadcast by The Sports Network in 1994.

The Hockey Hall of Fame also displays "Media honourees", who have been awarded the "Elmer Ferguson Memorial Award", which is awarded by the Professional Hockey Writers' Association to "distinguished members of the newspaper profession whose words have brought honour to journalism and to hockey", or the "Foster Hewitt Memorial Award", which is awarded by the NHL Broadcasters' Association to "members of the radio and television industry who made outstanding contributions to their profession and the game during their career in hockey broadcasting". However, the media honourees are not considered full inductees, and are not included in this list. The winners are announced and honoured at different times than the other honourees. Foster Hewitt is the only media honouree inducted in his own right into the Hall, as a builder.

As of 2022, there are 293 players (including nine women), 113 builders and 16 on-ice officials in the Hockey Hall of Fame. 17 honourees have been inducted posthumously.

Members
The Player category has been in existence since the beginning of the Hall of Fame and the first nine players were inducted in 1945. For a person to be inducted to the Hockey Hall of Fame as a player, they must have been retired for a minimum of three years and must be nominated by an elected 18-person selection committee. The waiting period was waived for ten players deemed exceptionally notable: Dit Clapper (1947), Maurice Richard (1961), Ted Lindsay (1966), Red Kelly (1969), Terry Sawchuk (1971), Jean Béliveau (1972), Gordie Howe (1972), Bobby Orr (1979), Mario Lemieux (1997), and Wayne Gretzky (1999). Following Wayne Gretzky's retirement, it was announced that the waiting period would no longer be waived for any player except under "certain humanitarian circumstances".

As of 2012, a maximum of four players can be inducted in one year but the greatest number of players inducted in a year was 23, in 1963. They were inducted because the Hall of Fame was trying to induct many pre-NHL era players. Sometimes noted as 1962 inductees, the pre-NHL era players were named at the 1962 Hall of Fame luncheon at the Canadian National Exhibition (CNE), but were inducted one year later, in 1963 at the CNE. 232 of the player inductees are Canadian-born, while 16 European-born players have been inducted. The NHL team with the most player inductees is the Toronto Maple Leafs (previously the Toronto St. Patricks and Toronto Arenas), with 60. Seventy-seven defencemen are in the Hall of Fame, more than any other current position, while only 36 goaltenders have been inducted.

In 1988, a "veteran player category" was established in order to "provide a vehicle for players who may have been overlooked and whose chances for election would be limited when placed on the same ballot with contemporary players". Eleven players were inducted into the category, but in 2000, the board of directors eliminated it, and now those inductees are considered to be in the player category.

* Indicates that the three-year waiting period was waived for a player who was deemed to be especially notable.
A. Player was inducted into the Veteran Player category. In 2000, it was merged with the Player category.

Source: 1945–2003: Honoured Members: Hockey Hall of Fame and newspapers.

Builders

The Builder category has been in existence since the beginning of the Hall of Fame and the first builders were inducted in 1945. A builder is a person who has contributed to the development of the game of hockey, and as the name refers, one who has built the game forward.  Since then, 102 builders have been inducted. For a person to be inducted to the Hockey Hall of Fame as a builder, they may be "active or inactive" and must be nominated by an elected 18-person selection committee. As of 2007, a maximum of two builders can be inducted in one year.

Former members

On March 30, 1993, it was announced that Gil Stein, who at the time was the president of the National Hockey League, had been inducted into the Hall of Fame. There were immediate allegations that he had engineered his election through manipulation of the hall's board of directors and by telling them to change the rules for selection. Two lawyers, hired by the league to lead an investigation, recommended that Stein's selection be overturned, although it was soon revealed that Stein had previously decided to turn down the induction.

In 1989, Alan Eagleson was inducted as a builder, but he resigned from the Hall in 1998 after pleading guilty of mail fraud and embezzlement of hundreds of thousands of dollars, these crimes having been perpetrated against NHL players and tournaments. His resignation came shortly before a vote was held to expel him.

On-ice officials

The On-ice official category has been in existence since 1961 and since then sixteen have been inducted. For an official to be inducted to the Hockey Hall of Fame, they must be retired for a minimum of three years and must be nominated by an elected 18-person selection committee. As of 2007, a maximum of one on-ice official can be inducted in one year.

Notes

References

 

Note: For the years after 2003, the Hockey Hall of Fame web site is accurate. , the web site is inaccurate for the years before, for the players inducted prior to the establishment of the Toronto Hall, for example Nels Stewart, who was inducted in 1952, not 1962 as is listed on the HHOF web site. This may have led to other publications stating the wrong years of induction. The book Honoured Members: Hockey Hall of Fame, published by the Hockey Hall of Fame itself, lists the players accurately.

 
 
 
 

Hockey Hall of Fame